Brendan Casey (born 22 February 1977) is an Australian sailor. He competed at the 2012 Summer Olympics in the Men's Finn class.

References

External links
 
 
 
 

1977 births
Living people
Australian male sailors (sport)
Olympic sailors of Australia
Sailors at the 2012 Summer Olympics – Finn